The Robert J. Collier Trophy is owned and administered by the National Aeronautic Association and is awarded annually "for the greatest achievement in aeronautics or astronautics in America, with respect to improving the performance, efficiency, and safety of air or space vehicles, the value of which has been thoroughly demonstrated by actual use during the preceding year."

Nominations 

The four nominations were:

 Boeing 787 Dreamliner
 C-5M Super Galaxy
 The Gamera Human-Powered Helicopter
 Taurus G-4 Electric-Powered Aircraft

Selection Committee 

On February 2, 2012, the National Aeronautic Association announced the nominations as well as the Selection Committee.

The Selection Committee consisted of:

 Walter Boyne, Chairman of the National Aeronautic Association and Chairman of the 2011 Collier Selection Committee
 Dick Rutan, Collier Recipient (1986)
 Joe Lombardo, Gulfstream Aerospace, Collier Recipient/Gulfstream V (2003)
 The Honorable Bobby Sturgell, Rockwell Collins, Collier Recipient/ADSB (2008)
 Jeff Pino, Sikorsky Aircraft Corporation, Collier Recipient/X2 (2010)
 Richard Aboulafia, The Teal Group
 Monte Belger, Aero Club of Washington
 The Honorable Marion Blakey, Aerospace Industries Association
 Bob Blouin, Hawker Beechcraft
 Ed Bolen, National Business Aviation Association
 Pete Bunce, General Aviation Manufacturers Association
 Steve Callaghan, National Aviation Club Committee of NAA
 Steve Champness, Aero Club of Atlanta
 David Coleal, Spirit AeroSystems
 Brian Glackin, Cobham
 Mathew Greene, Safe Flight Instrument
 Leo Knaapen, Bombardier
 John Langford, Aurora Flight Sciences
 Dave Manke, United Technologies	
 Mary Miller, Signature Flight Support/BBA Aviation
 Stan O’Conner, GE Aviation
 Steve Plummer, Rolls-Royce, North America
 Skip Ringo, DRS
 Bob Rubino, Lockheed Martin
 Ed Scott, United States Parachute Association
 Bob Stangarone, Embraer
 Al Tyler, Soaring Society of America
 Mark Van Tine, Jeppesen
 Tony Velocci, Aviation Week and Space Technology
 Bob Vilhaeur, Boeing
 Diane White, Cessna Aircraft Company
 Jonathan Gaffney, President and CEO of NAA, Director (Non-Voting Member)

Presenters

C-5M Galaxy
 Major Gen Wayne Schatz, Director - Strategic Plans, Requirements and Programs, Headquarters Air Mobility Command, Scott Air Force Base, Illinois
 Lt. Colonel Craig Harmon, Commander, 9th Airlift Squadron, Dover Air Force Base, Delaware

Gamera Human Powered Helicopter
 Ben Berry, PhD student, Alfred Gessow Rotorcraft Center, Dept. of Aerospace Engineering,  University of Maryland 
 Joe Schmaus, PhD student, Alfred Gessow Rotorcraft Center, Dept. of Aerospace Engineering,  University of Maryland

Team Pipistrel-USA
 Dr. Jack Langelaan, Assistant Professor, Aerospace Engineering, Penn State
 Dr. Mark Maughmer, Professor, Aerospace Engineering, Penn State

Boeing 787
 Jim Albaugh, President and CEO, Commercial Airplanes, The Boeing Company
 Scott Fancher, Vice President and General Manager, 787 Program

Process 

The Collier Selection Committee will meet on Monday, March 13, 2012 in Arlington, Virginia.

The Recipient will be announced on Tuesday, March 14.

References

American science and technology awards